Peroxisomal membrane protein 11B is a protein that in humans is encoded by the PEX11B gene. It is involved in the regulation of peroxisome abundance.

Interactions
PEX11B has been shown to interact with PEX19.

Related gene problems
1q21.1 deletion syndrome
1q21.1 duplication syndrome

References

Further reading